Fausto González Sibaja (born 13 September 1978 in Ciudad Quesada, San Carlos) is a former Costa Rican footballer who played as goalkeeper. He is known as El Golero Loco for his attempts to confuse rivals during penalty shots.

Club career
Before signing with Saprissa, González played for several teams in Costa Rica, such as San Carlos, Herediano, whom he joined in December 1999, and Cartaginés. With Saprissa, he has won two national championships and a CONCACAF Champions Cup, and was part of the team that played the 2005 FIFA Club World Championship Toyota Cup, where Saprissa finished third behind São Paulo and Liverpool. At most of his teams he has been the reserve goalkeeper.

International career
On junior level, he played in 1995 FIFA U-17 World Championship held in Ecuador, and the 1997 FIFA World Youth Championship held in Malaysia.

References

1978 births
Living people
People from San Carlos (canton)
Association football goalkeepers
Costa Rican footballers
C.S. Cartaginés players
C.S. Herediano footballers
A.D. San Carlos footballers
Deportivo Saprissa players